Scott Naylor (2 February 1972) is an English former professional rugby league footballer who played in the 1990s and 2000s, and has coached in the 2010s and 2020s.

Playing career

International honours
Scott Naylor won caps for England while at the Bradford Bulls in the 2000 Rugby League World Cup against Australia, Fiji (1-try), Ireland (interchange/substitute) and New Zealand.

World Club Challenge appearances
Naylor played left- in the Bradford Bull's (Super League VI champions) 41-26 victory over the Newcastle Knights (2001 NRL Premiers) in the 2002 World Club Challenge at Alfred McAlpine Stadium, Huddersfield, England on Friday 1 February 2002, in front of a crowd of 21,113.

Super League Grand final appearances
Naylor played left- in the Bradford Bulls' 6-8 defeat by St. Helens in the 1999 Super League Grand Final during 1999's Super League IV at Old Trafford, Manchester on Saturday 9 October 1999, in front of a crowd of 50,717, he played left- in the 37-6 victory over the Wigan Warriors in the 2001 Super League Grand Final during 2001's Super League VI at Old Trafford, Manchester on Saturday 13 October 2001, in front of a crowd of 60,164, and he played left- and scored a try in the 18-19 defeat by St. Helens in the 2002 Super League Grand Final during 2002's Super League VII at Old Trafford, Manchester on Saturday 19 October 2002, in front of a crowd of 61,138.

Challenge Cup final appearances
Naylor played left- in the Bradford Bulls' 24-18 victory over the Leeds Rhinos in the 2000 Challenge Cup Final during 2000's Super League V at Murrayfield Stadium, Edinburgh, Scotland on Saturday 9 October 1999, in front of a crowd of 67,247, he played left- in the 6-13 defeat by St. Helens in the 2001 Challenge Cup Final during 2001's Super League VI at Murrayfield Stadium, Edinburgh, Scotland on Saturday 13 October 2001, in front of a crowd of 68,250, and he played left- in the 22-20 victory over the Leeds Rhinos in the 2003 Challenge Cup Final during 2003's Super League VIII at Millennium Stadium, Cardiff, Wales on Saturday 19 October 2002, in front of a crowd of 71,212.

Club career
Naylor made his début for the Wigan Warriors in the 34-14 victory over the Dewsbury Rams in the 1991 Regal Trophy preliminary round at Central Park, Wigan on Tuesday 29 October 1991, he scored no tries for the Wigan Warriors, and he played his last match for the Wigan Warriors in the 18-0 victory over the Hull Kingston Rovers in the 1991 Regal Trophy 2 round at Craven Park, Kingston upon Hull on Sunday 6 December 1992.

Honoured at Bradford Bulls
Naylor was included in Bradford Bulls' 'Bull Masters'.

References

External links
(archived by web.archive.org) Oldham profile
Search for "Scott Naylor" at britishnewspaperarchive.co.uk
Search for ""Scott Naylor"" at loverugbyleague.com

1972 births
Living people
Bradford Bulls players
England national rugby league team players
English rugby league coaches
English rugby league players
Oldham R.L.F.C. coaches
Place of birth missing (living people)
Rugby league centres
Rugby league second-rows
Rugby league wingers
Salford Red Devils coaches
Salford Red Devils players
Wigan Warriors players